Race 3 is a 2018 Indian Hindi-language action crime film directed by Remo D'Souza and Written by Kiran Kotrial and Shiraz Ahmed, produced under Tips Industries and Salman Khan Films. The film features Salman Khan, Anil Kapoor, Bobby Deol, Jacqueline Fernandez, Daisy Shah, Saqib Saleem and Freddy Daruwala. It is the final installment of Race film series which started with Race in 2008 and Race 2 in 2013, but has a loosely related plot to the previous films.

Race 3 was released on 15 June 2018 coinciding with Eid. It received mostly negative reviews, with criticism for its script, plot, casting, music and action sequences . Despite negative reviews, it has a successful box office collection collecting  in India and approximately  worldwide. It became the 44th highest grossing Indian film of all time.

Plot 
 
Shamsher Singh is a powerful Indian arms dealer in Abu Dhabi and owns a private island, Al-Shifa, for trading arms. Sikander Singh is Shamsher's stepson, who is also known by his pet name 'Sikku'. Yash, Shamsher's assistant, is a close associate at Shamsher's empire, and Raghuvendra "Raghu" Singh, is the personal assistant and close confidante to Shamsher. In a flashback scene, it is revealed that Rana Singha is Shamsher's business rival, who creates problems for Shamsher's family and his business. As Sanjana and Sooraj, Shamsher's children, reach 25 years old, their family lawyer explains their deceased mother's will. As per the will, the twins are entitled to 50% of the property and 50% of the shares as joint partners (25% each), and the remaining 50% for Sikander. This disparity causes the twins to hate Sikander even more as Shamsher preferred Sikander more than the twins. Shamsher tells both of them that Sikander is the son of Shamsher's elder brother, Ranchor Singh, who was actually CEO of Al-Shifa.

In a flashback, that portrays the Handia village of the 1970s, the history of the Singh family is depicted. Both the Singh brothers used to supply weapons to Indian army. Local politicians of Handia asked them for illegal weapons, to which Ranchor refused. His refusal caused a rivalry with a local politician, Gajendra Pathak. One day, during an ambush on an arms truck which was owned by Ranchor's company, Vijendra's son Narendra was killed by Ranchor. Then Ranchor died when his car was blown-up by a bomb. The arms company owned by the Singh family was then declared to be an anti-state organization and accused of supplying weapons to terrorists. Shamsher sent Sikander to Beijing for studies and took Sikander's widowed mother Sumitra to Al-Shifa. After a year, the twins were born.

In present-day Al-Shifa, one night, Yash talks about his girlfriend. Sikander reveals that in Beijing, he fell in love with a girl named Jessica who severed ties with him. Shamsher's childhood friend Brijmohan tells him that his friend's hotel was used by politicians for their lascivious motives where all the activity was captured on a spy video camera and stored on a hard disk. The hard disk was kept in a bank locker in Cambodia. Shamsher appoints Sikander to recover of the hard disk, and he promises to get the disk. The next day, during a party, it is revealed that Jessica is actually Yash's girlfriend. Sikander and Jessica meet privately in the security room. The next day, Sooraj and Sanjana, who had recorded the Sikander-Jessica meet, screen the video to Yash. A furious Yash goes to Jessica's apartment and finds Sikander present with her. Sikander later tells him that both of their past interactions with Jessica were planned by Sooraj and Sanjana, as part of their plan to destroy Sikander. Yash teams up with Sikander against the twins but pretends to be with the twins as well. Sikander, the twins, Yash and Jessica, execute the mission to recover the hard disk.

After retrieving the hard disk, Shamsher eliminates Sikander by planting explosives in his car and heads to a conference with the politicians whose objectionable videos were stored on the disk. Shamsher tells of Sikander's death to the politicians, in the presence of the twins. He then plugs the hard disk and is shocked to find out that the disk was not the original one. Rather, it only contained a video, self-filmed by Sumitra before her death, in which she reveals the truth that Ranchor was killed by Shamsher, and the twins were Ranchor's kids. Sikander arrives, and reveals that he knew that Shamsher killed his dad, but kept it a secret for ten years and had been pretending to be loyal to Shamsher. Shamsher reveals that Yash is his real son to the twins before beating them up and before Sikander's arrival. After a fight in the desert between Sikander and Yash, Sikander demolishes Shamsher's entire army and makes both Yash and Shamsher surrender to Jessica who happens to be an Interpol officer. The arrested father-son duo are flown to their native village Handia.

In the climax, Sikander reveals that he had been planning events along all and revealed all the plans and secrets to the twins and Jessica. Shamsher is seen bribing a police officer, while Yash is seen to be toning his body inside the prison cell. Sikander, reuniting with his twin siblings in Al-Shifa, reveals the plot of handing over the original hard disks to Jessica. Sikander makes a metaphorical statement and calls himself the "Tiger" of a new race as he refuses to elaborate.

Cast 
 Anil Kapoor as Shamsher Singh: Ranchor's brother; Sumitra's second husband; Sikander, Suraj and Sanjana's uncle; Yash's father
 Salman Khan as Sikander "Sikku" Singh: Sumitra and Ranchor's elder son; Suraj and Sanjana's brother
 Bobby Deol as Yash Singh: Shamsher's son
 Jacqueline Fernandez as Interpol officer Jessica Gomes: Sikander's love interest
 Daisy Shah as Sanjana Singh: Sumitra and Ranchor's daughter; Sikander and Suraj's sister
 Saqib Saleem as Suraj Singh: Sumitra and Ranchor's younger son; Sikander and Sanjana's brother
 Sharat Saxena as Raghuvendra "Raghu" Sinha: Bodyguard of Singh Family
 Freddy Daruwala as Rana Vijay Singh: Shamsher's enemy and later partner
 Rajesh Sharma as Brijesh Mohan Gandhi: Shamsher's childhood friend
 Nishigandha Wad as Sumitra Singh: Ranchor's widow; Shamsher's second wife; Sikandar, Sanjana and Suraj's mother
 Milind Gunaji as Ranchor Singh: Shamsher's brother; Sumitra's first husband; Sikander, Sanjana and Suraj's father
 Narendra Jha as Interpol officer Vikram Khanna
 Chaitannya Kanhai as Narendra Pathak: Gajendra's son
 B. K. Tiwari as Gajendra Pathak: Narendra's father and a politician in Handia

Production

Development 
In the year 2015, it was confirmed by director-duo Abbas–Mustan that a third instalment in the Race franchise was being planned with Saif Ali Khan returning in the lead role. In 2016, it was reported that producer Ramesh Taurani had approached Salman Khan for Race 3 but he refused to do the film and asked Taurani to make some changes in the script. This report was confirmed to be true by Khan himself at the Trailer launch event of the film on 15 May 2018. In August 2017, it was reported that Khan had agreed to be a part of Race 3 on the condition that choreographer-turned-director Remo D'Souza would direct the film. In August 2017, it was reported that Saif had decided not to be a part of the film as he was opposed to the idea of him playing a parallel lead to Salman. After media reports surfaced about Katrina Kaif, Jacqueline Fernandez and Deepika Padukone being considered for the female lead opposite Khan, it was confirmed during August 2017 that Fernandez had been finalised for the role. To prepare for the action sequences that she had to do in the film, Fernandez underwent extensive training in Mixed martial arts (MMA).

Filming 
The shooting of Race 3 began on 9 November 2017 at the Mehboob Studios in Mumbai. The filming of Race 3 moved to Bangkok in Thailand for its second schedule where they filmed a song and an action sequence, which was choreographed by Anal Arasu, at the Floating Market and Rose Garden as well as the jungles of Kanchanaburi Province. After finishing the shoot in Thailand, the team reached Abu Dhabi for its next schedule. The shooting schedule in Abu Dhabi lasted for 35 days where filming was done at Emirates Palace, Yas Viceroy Abu Dhabi, The St. Regis Abu Dhabi, Abu Dhabi National Exhibition Centre, Emirates Steel and the Liwa Desert. The action sequences in Abu Dhabi were choreographed by Tom Struthers, who has previously worked on movies like Inception, The Dark Knight and Dunkirk. For its next schedule, the film unit moved to Kashmir and later on to Ladakh where Salman Khan and Jacqueline Fernandez filmed a romantic song. During the shooting, Khan was convicted in the Blackbuck poaching case on 5 April 2018 by a Jodhpur Sessions Court, as a result of which the remaining patchwork of the film was completed in Jaisalmer, Rajasthan instead of Abu Dhabi because the film was running behind its schedule and Jaisalmer had a landscape similar to that of Abu Dhabi.

Soundtrack 
The music of the film is composed by Meet Bros, JAM8, Vishal Mishra, Vicky-Hardik, Shivay Vyas, and Gurinder Seagal, while the lyrics are penned by Salman Khan, Kumaar, Hardik Acharya, Shabbir Ahmed, Shloke Lal, Shivay Vyas, Shanky, Rimi Nique, Kunaal Vermaa and Raja Kumari. The background score is composed by Salim–Sulaiman. The songs featured in the film are sung by Atif Aslam, Iulia Vantur, Deep Money, Neha Bhasin, Kamaal Khan, Amit Mishra, Jonita Gandhi, Sreerama Chandra, Raja Kumari, Mika Singh, Salman Khan, Veera Saxena, Shivai Vyas, Gurinder Seagal, Payal Dev and Vishal Mishra. The first song of the film titled as "Heeriye", which is sung by Deep Money, Neha Bhasin and Kamaal Khan was released on 18 May 2018. The second song of the film to be released was "Selfish", which is sung by Atif Aslam and Iulia Vantur and was released on 25 May 2018. The third song of the film, "Allah Duhai Hai", which is sung by Amit Mishra, Jonita Gandhi, Sreerama Chandra and rapped by Raja Kumari was released on 1 June 2018. The fourth track, "Party Chale On", which is sung by Mika Singh and Iulia Vantur, was released on 8 June 2018. The album of the film was released by Tips Music on 12 June 2018.

Reception

Critical response

Rachit Gupta of The Times of India gave the film 2/5 stars and said, "Race 3 just doesn't work up the feeling of suspense and intrigue that made the previous masala movies from the franchise a guilty pleasure". Rohit Vats of Hindustan Times gave film 1/5 stars and called it a "mere show-reel....Best directed, with a ridiculous plot and sub-par acting, this is a new high for the superstar..... It's really difficult to sit through 160-minutes of terribly very good film-making". Rajeev Masand of News18, too, gave it 1/5 star and said the film is "complete drivel".

Although Meena Iyer of DNA praised introduction of characters, she still criticised the film saying, "Race 3 is boasting of being an intelligible film which has been made to clear the cobwebs in your mind", and rated the film 2/5. Anita Iyer of Khaleej Times gave it 1.5/5 and felt that the film short growth of expectations. Swetha Ramakrishan of Firstpost called it "funny, kitschy and audacious".

Film Companion's film critic Anupama Chopra gave it 2/5 stars saying that the storytelling was sacrificed at the altar of Salman Khan. Joe Laydon of Variety wrote about the film, "This in-name-only Bollywood sequel delivers fast and furious action, spirited song and dance, but way too many narrative speed bumps". Saibal Chaterjee of NDTV gave the film 1.5/5 stars praising its climax, and calling the rest "clue stuntman". Shreehari H of Qrius remarked the film to be one of the worst films of the year where Salman Khan seemed to be rather like a pterodactyl whose airborne exploits would have shamed many winged dinosaurs.

Sukanya Verma of Rediff.com gave no stars to the film and wrote, "Race 3 doesn't merely demand you to leave your brains behind but guarantees you won't find them anywhere even after the ordeal is over". Priyadarshini Patya of MensXP.com rated the film 1/5 and said, "Race 3 is just Salman Khan's business, none of the viewers' business". Sonal Dehdia of Mid-Day gave the film 1/5 stars and said, "There are two pehlus (aspects) to this film too – first, it is atrocious and second, it will mint money at the box-office nonetheless". Dhavesh Sharma of Filmfare gave the film 3/5 stars and wrote, "A dysfunctional, ultra rich family, shady deals, fast cars, high speed chases, sassy women, macho men and enough plot twists to make Abbas Mustan go groggy with delight, Race 3 has all these and more'.

Bollywood Hungama gave the film 2/5 stars and write, "On the whole, RACE 3 is high on style and low on substance". Ritika Handoo of Zee News, giving it 2.5/5 stars, said, "the action thriller lacks depth". Namrata Joshi of The Hindu criticized the film as a "compendium of inanities" and that the songs resembled standalone music videos. Shilpa Jamkhandikar of Reuters described the film as "a minefield of meme-worthy moments, replete with hilarious dialogue, a plot ripe for parody and abysmal acting". Umesh punwani of Koimoi gave the film 2/5 stars and said, "On the whole Race 3 is not entirely unentertaining but it is majorly disappointing". Manjusha Radhakrishan of Gulf News gave the film 1.5/5 stars and called it "doomed adventure".

Stutee Gosh of The Quint gave the film 1/5 stars and said "The moments of lull are so many in this 159-minute-long Race 3 that we develop a strange detachment from the on-screen proceedings". Suprana Sharma of Deccan Chronicle gave the film 1/5 stars calling it " a slow, dim-witted crawl to nowhere". Rohit Bhatnagar of Deccan Chronicle noted it to be an ''illogical yawn-fest'', located too distant from reality and as Salman's worst act, ever. Nandini Ramnath of Scroll.in criticized the film and noted that ''Even die-hard fans will find the going tough....Remo, (who) appears to have been too much in awe of his leading man to have actually given him any basic instructions on the sets....''. Udita Jhunjhunwala of Livemint noted it to be a long film completely devoid of any minimal science or logic and with shoddy dance routines grooved on pedestrian lyrics.

Tanul Thakur of Wire.in noted the film to be a garden variety shoddy joke, suffocated with numerous out-of-sync twists, disregarding logic, flow, and consistency. Priyanka Bhadani of the Week.in gave the film 1/5 stars noting it to a logic defying bad spoof of a spoof with a cringe-worthy script and where Salman Khan got reduced to a caricature of his real life persona.

The film made to multiple lists for being one of the worst films of the year with one remarking it to have "insulted the audience's intelligence".

Box office

Domestic 
The film released on 4300 screens and collected  285.0 million on opening day in India becoming one of the biggest opener of the year.

Overseas 
On opening day, the film collected US$127,510 from 49 screens in Australia, US$68,779 from 27 screens in New Zealand, US$337,080 from 137 screens in the United Kingdom, US$477,511 from 281 screens in the United States, and US$10,371 from 6 screens in Canada.

On second day the film collected US$143,302 from 51 screens in Australia, US$77,619 from 30 screens in New Zealand, US$412,036 from 136 screens in the UK, US$512,914 from 283 screens in the United States and US$9,230 from 5 screens in Canada. On the first Sunday, the film collected US$45,905 from 28 screens in Australia and US$71,217 from 26 screens in New Zealand. In 4 days, the film grossed  overseas.

References

External links 
 
 
 
 

2018 films
2018 3D films
Indian 3D films
Indian auto racing films
Indian action thriller films
Films shot in Abu Dhabi
Indian sequel films
Films shot in Bangkok
Films shot in Thailand
Films produced by Salman Khan
Films scored by Salim–Sulaiman
Films shot in Ladakh
2010s Hindi-language films
Films distributed by Yash Raj Films
2018 action thriller films
Films directed by Remo D'Souza